Juan Ruiz de Colmenero (1596 – 28 September 1663) was a Roman Catholic prelate who served as Bishop of Guadalajara (1646–1663).

Biography
Juan Ruiz de Colmenero was born in Budia, Spain. On 25 June 1646, he was selected by the King of Spain and confirmed by Pope Alexander VII as Bishop of Guadalajara. In December 1647, he was consecrated bishop by Marcos Ramírez de Prado y Ovando, Bishop of Michoacán and installed to the bishopric on 24 December 1647. He served as Bishop of Guadalajara until his death on 28 September 1663.

References

External links and additional sources
 (for Chronology of Bishops)
 (for Chronology of Bishops)

1596 births
1663 deaths
17th-century Roman Catholic bishops in Mexico
Bishops appointed by Pope Alexander VII